Euclidia is a genus of moths in the family Erebidae.

Taxonomy
The genus Callistege was previously included as a subgenus of Euclidia.

Species
 Subgenus Euclidia
 Euclidia ardita Franclemont, 1957 – erebid moth
 Euclidia consors Butler, 1878
 Euclidia cuspidea Hübner, 1818 – toothed somberwing
 Euclidia dentata Staudinger, 1892
 Euclidia glyphica (Linnaeus, 1758) – burnet companion
 Euclidia limbosa Guenee, 1852
 Euclidia tarsalis Walker, 1865
 Euclidia vittata Philippi, 1860
 Subgenus Gonospileia Hubner, 1823
 Euclidia amudarya Weisert, 1998
 Euclidia munita Hübner, 1813
 Euclidia triquetra Denis & Schiffermüller, 1775

References

 Euclidia at Markku Savela's Lepidoptera and Some Other Life Forms
 Natural History Museum Lepidoptera genus database

 
Euclidiini
Moth genera